Fath Air Base is a military airfield near Karaj, Alborz Province, Iran.

Location
Fath Air Base is located near Karaj, Alborz Province, Iran. It is assigned the ICAO airport code OIIF. It is mainly used as a base for helicopters of the Helicopter Training Squadron, Attack Helicopter Squadron and Training & Recce Helicopter Squadron of the Iranian Revolutionary Guard Corps Aerospace Force.

Accidents and incidents

On 14 January 2019, a Boeing 707 of Saha Airlines overran the runway on landing, killing fifteen of the sixteen people on board. It was reported that the aircraft should have landed at Payam International Airport but landed at Fath in error. Payam is located 10.9 kilometres (5.9 nmi) northwest of Fath Air Base.

A crash was avoided in a similar incident on 16 November 2018, when a Taban Airlines MD-88 carrying 155 people twice attempted to land on this runway, mistaking it for a longer 3,659-metre (12,005 ft) runway at Payam International Airport, which is nearly inline but 11 km away. The first approach was aborted at 11:26 hours and the aircraft circled for another attempt. The second  approach was aborted at 11:29 and the aircraft continued for a safe landing at Payam Airport at 11:31. AAID Iran reported that the flight reached an altitude of 1 m above ground level during one of the approaches. The MD-88 requires a minimum of approximately 1,500 m of runway to land safely, 500 m more than the 981 m runway at Fath Air Base.

References

Iranian airbases
Airports in Iran